Roter Graben may refer to:

Roter Graben (Große Röder), a river of Saxony, Germany, tributary of the Große Röder
Roter Graben (Swabian Rezat),  river of Bavaria, Germany, tributary of the Swabian Rezat